Notre Dame High School is a private co-educational 7-12 school in Chemung County, Elmira, New York, United States.  It was established in 1955 and is located within the Roman Catholic Diocese of Rochester.

Athletics 
Notre Dame competes in Section IV of the New York State Public High School Athletic Association.

Baseball 
Notre Dame won the Class C State Championship in 1997.

Softball 
The Lady Crusaders won the Class C State Championship in 2011 and 2016.

Boys Basketball 
Notre Dame's boys basketball won the Class A State Championship in 1978.

Girls Basketball 
The girls' basketball  team won the Class C State Championship in 2006 and 2007.

Boys Soccer 
Notre Dame won the Class C State Championship in 2015, scoring a state-record 186 goals during the season.

Girls Soccer 
The girls' soccer team won the Class C State Championship in 2003.

Notable alumni
 Elizabeth Carolan, Class of 1998
 John Hall, Class of 1965
 Molly Huddle, Class of 2002
 Stanley L. Klos, Class of 1972
 Jeanine Pirro, Class of 1968
 Bill Spaulding

References 

Catholic secondary schools in New York (state)
Roman Catholic Diocese of Rochester
Educational institutions established in 1955
Buildings and structures in Elmira, New York
Schools in Chemung County, New York
1955 establishments in New York (state)